Eribulin, sold under the brand name Halaven, is an anticancer medication used to treat breast cancer and liposarcoma.

The most common side effects include fatigue, nausea, hair loss (alopecia), constipation, certain nerve damage causing weakness or numbness in the hands and feet (peripheral neuropathy), abdominal pain and fever (pyrexia). Eribulin may also cause low levels of infection-fighting white blood cells (neutropenia) or decreased levels of potassium or calcium.

Approvals and indications
Eribulin was approved for medical use in the European Union in March 2011, and it is indicated for the treatment of:
 people with locally advanced or metastatic breast cancer who have progressed after at least one chemotherapeutic regimens for advanced disease. Prior therapy should have included an anthracycline and a taxane unless the people were not suitable for these treatments.
 adults with unresectable liposarcoma who have received prior anthracycline containing therapy (unless unsuitable) for advanced or metastatic disease.

Breast cancer
The mesylate salt was approved by the U.S. Food and Drug Administration (FDA) on November 15, 2010, with an indication to treat people with metastatic breast cancer who have received at least two prior chemotherapy regimens for late-stage disease, including both anthracycline- and taxane-based chemotherapies. It was approved by Health Canada on December 14, 2011, with an indication for the treatment of people with metastatic breast cancer who have previously received at least two chemotherapeutic regimens for the treatment of metastatic disease. Metastatic breast cancer impacts about 150,000 people in the U.S. and due to the small patient population, Eisai was able to file a New Drug Application (NDA) under the orphan and rare disease designation.

Liposarcoma
On January 28, 2016, the U.S. Food and Drug Administration (FDA) approved eribulin for the treatment of inoperable liposarcoma in people who received prior chemotherapy that contained an anthracycline drug. A Phase III trial reported: With eribulin the median overall survival for participants with liposarcoma was 15.6 months, compared to 8.4 months for participants treated with dacarbazine.

Adverse effects 

Structure and mechanism
Eribulin is a fully synthetic macrocyclic ketone analogue of the marine natural product halichondrin B, the parent molecule being a naturally occurring, potent mitotic inhibitor with a unique mechanism of action.  The parent molecule was originally found in the sponge Halichondria okadai.

Eribulin is a mechanistically unique inhibitor of microtubule dynamics, binding predominantly to a small number of high affinity sites at the plus ends of existing microtubules.
Eribulin has both cytotoxic and non-cytotoxic mechanisms of action.  Its cytotoxic effects are related to its antimitotic activities, wherein apoptosis of cancer cells is induced following prolonged and irreversible mitotic blockade. In addition to its cytotoxic, antimitotic-based mechanisms, preclinical studies in human breast cancer models have shown that eribulin also exerts complex effects on the biology of surviving cancer cells and residual tumors that appear unrelated to its antimitotic effects. These non-mitotic mechanisms include vascular remodeling that leads to increased tumor perfusion and mitigation of tumor hypoxia, phenotypic changes consistent with reversal of epithelial-mesenchymal transition (EMT), and decreased capacity for migration and invasion leading to reduced metastatic capacity as measured in a preclinical experimental metastasis model. In other studies, eribulin treatment of leiomyosarcoma and liposarcoma cells leads to increased expression of smooth muscle and adipocyte differentiation antigens, respectively. Taxane-resistant cancers are often unresponsive to eribulin. A recent study found that this resistance is due to expression of multidrug resistance protein 1 (MDR1). Fluorescently labeled eribulin has been used to study the pharmacokinetics and pharmacodynamics at single cell level in vivo.

The synthesis of eribulin was first published in 2001; a new synthetic route to the drug was published in 2009.

Clinical trials

Eribulin is being investigated for use in a variety of other solid tumors, including breast cancer, non-small cell lung cancer, prostate cancer, brain cancer, cervical cancer, urothelial cancer, melanoma, solitary fibrous tumors, and various sarcomas.

Research and development
Two new eribulin based products are in the research and development phase; a liposomal formulation and antibody drug combination therapy, both are for the treatment of solid tumors. The liposomal formulation of eribulin, E7389 liposomal, is currently in Phase I clinical trials. Preliminary in vivo experiments show a decrease in C(max) and a longer half-life with the liposomal formulation. The drug antibody eribulin combination therapy is a joint venture between Eisai and Merck. The clinical trials combine eribulin and pembrolizumab, a PD-1 inhibitor, for the treatment of breast cancer and other advanced cancers.

Intellectual Property

Currently there are five active patents in the United States that are associated with the Halaven drug application, N201532. The first one expired on June 16, 2019, the last one (USRE46965) expires on January 8, 2027.

References

External links 
 
 

Antineoplastic drugs
Macrocycles
Orphan drugs
Tetrahydropyrans
Tetrahydrofurans